The Priest from Kirchfeld (German: Der Pfarrer von Kirchfeld) is a 1955 West German drama film directed by Hans Deppe and starring Ulla Jacobsson, Claus Holm and Annie Rosar. It is based on the play Der Pfarrer von Kirchfeld by Ludwig Anzengruber.

The film's sets were designed by the art directors Willi Herrmann and Heinrich Weidemann. It was shot at the Spandau Studios and on location in Rosenheim in Bavaria.

Plot
Vinzenz Heller, the priest of Kirchfeld, is highly esteemed by his congregation. The Kriegerwitwe Stricker lives with the railwayman Franz Wagner in the concubinage. This sin is condemned by Heller, but nevertheless, Knight's ten-year-old boy may serve as a ministrant to the priest. It is not the case, however, that Karli Stricker suffers a serious conscience of conscience, which the priest can not overcome. The only reason why the railroad does not want to marry the knights is that they would lose their pension.

The Concordat provides, under certain circumstances before a secret marriage without a civil marriage must precede. For this reason Heller speaks to the Ordinariat. However, his request is denied because no social emergency is apparent.

In the parsonage the refugee girl Anna Birkmaier has been living for some time. This is supported by the old parishioner Brigitte. But the longer Anna stays in the parsonage, the more she feels attracted to the priest. He too begins to desire the girl, but he knows how to restrain his lust. Brigitte observes this development with great concern because she knows the gossip about the village. There is also one in the place, which is not well-disposed towards the priest: the rich innkeeper Josef Riedl. It can not be that the pastor once condemned the alcohol from the pulpit, whereupon fewer guests visited his place.

Anna is always more and more courted by the village smith Michl Ambacher. The girl, however, gives him a discharge. She never wants to marry, but always stay in the parsonage. One day, she reveals to her boss that she is the mother of a little boy. He was in a neighboring place in nursing. His father had not been able to marry her because he died before all the documents were together. She had only applied for a position in Kirchfeld in order to be near her son.

One day Karli Stricker disappeared. His mother had left the news that he would never return. When he is found after a few days, the pastor is plagued by the bad conscience. Now he resists the prohibition of the church authorities and secretly distrusts the boy's mother with the railwayman. Someone in the village got wind of it and makes sure that the news spreads into wind cables. To the parishioner, he was together with Anna with her son and then went to a concert with her in the city. They missed the last train and had to spend the night in the waiting room. When they return to Kirchfeld in the morning, they are watched by the innkeeper Riedl, whereupon he spreads the rumor, the priest had a relationship with his employees. Gradually more and more villagers turn away from the priest. When Anna realizes what the priest is at stake, she agrees to marry the village smith, although she does not feel love for him. To the priest's attempt to expel her plan, the girl meets with the demand that he may give up his priesthood to enter into marriage with her. For this, however, Father Heller can not make up his mind. His last official address in Kirchfeld is Anna's marriage with Michl Ambacher. Then he is transferred to another community.

Cast
 Ulla Jacobsson as Anna Birkmaier  
 Claus Holm as Vinzenz Heller, Pfarrer von Kirchfeld  
 Annie Rosar as Brigitte, Pfarrersköchin  
 Heinrich Gretler as Sepp Riedl, Gastwirt  
 Elise Aulinger as Mutter Riedl  
 Kurt Heintel as Michi Ambacher  
 Hansi Knoteck as Frau Stricher, Kriegerswitwe  
 Helen Vita as Zenzi, Kelalnerin  
 Fritz Genschow as Franz Wagner, Eisenbahner  
 Hans Reiser as Friedrich Ademeit, Pianist  
 Franz Schafheitlin as Prosecutor
 Olga Limburg as Oberin  
 Peter Feldt as Karli

References

Bibliography 
 Goble, Alan. The Complete Index to Literary Sources in Film. Walter de Gruyter, 1999.

External links 
 

1955 films
1955 drama films
German drama films
West German films
1950s German-language films
Films directed by Hans Deppe
German films based on plays
Films based on works by Ludwig Anzengruber
Films about Catholic priests
Remakes of German films
Films set in the Alps
Constantin Film films
Films shot at Spandau Studios
Films shot in Bavaria
1950s German films